Anastasia Vasilyevna Savchenko (born 8 April 1989, Omsk) is a Russian pole vaulter.

Achievements

References

External links

1989 births
Living people
Russian female pole vaulters
Athletes (track and field) at the 2012 Summer Olympics
Olympic athletes of Russia
Universiade medalists in athletics (track and field)
Sportspeople from Omsk
Universiade gold medalists for Russia
Competitors at the 2011 Summer Universiade
Medalists at the 2013 Summer Universiade